Ker is a surname. Notable people with the surname include:

 Alice Stewart Ker (1853–1943), Scottish doctor and suffragette
 Allan Ebenezer Ker (1883–1958), Scottish army officer and recipient of the Victoria Cross
 Ker Chien-ming (born 1951), Taiwanese politician
 Crawford Ker (born 1962), American football player
 David Ker (1758–1805), Scottish-Irish-American first residing professor of the University of North Carolina
 David Stewart Ker (1816–1878), Irish landowner and politician
 George Ker (fl. 1870s and 1880s), Scottish footballer
 Humphrey Ker (born 1982), British actor, writer and comedian
 John Ker (disambiguation), several people
 Lucas Arnold Ker (born 1974), Argentinian tennis player
 Neil Ripley Ker (1908–1982), scholar of Anglo-Saxon literature
 Richard Ker (1822–1890), British politician from Ireland
 Richard Ker (MP) (1850–1942), British politician from Ireland 
 Robert Ker (disambiguation), several people
 William Ker (disambiguation), several people

See also
 Kerr (surname)